Ustad Sabri Khan (21 May 1927 – 1 December 2015) was an Indian sarangi player, who was descended on both sides of his family from a line of distinguished musicians.

Early life
Sabri Khan was born on 21 May 1927 in Moradabad, Uttar Pradesh, British India. He belonged to the Sainia Gharana. This Gharana traces the tradition of its music back to Mian Tansen, the great vocalist in the court of Mughal Emperor Akbar. He had been initiated into sarangi-playing by his grandfather, Ustad Haji Mohammed Khan and later continued his training under his father Ustad Chajju Khan, both accomplished sarangi exponents of their time. Khan also learned some important and rare techniques of playing from his uncle Ustad Laddan Khan of Rampur.

Music career
Sabri Khan played sarangi with a galaxy of vocalist musicians on All India Radio and also served as a staff artiste there. He accompanied the noted sitar player Ravi Shankar and tabla player Alla Rakha on their tour of the United States in the early 1960s.

Sabri Khan toured extensively across the world and performed in Afghanistan, Pakistan, China, Japan, USSR, United States, Canada, England, France, Germany, the Netherlands, Belgium, Italy, Spain, the Czech Republic, Slovakia, Bulgaria, Sweden, Norway, Finland and Mexico. The credit of introducing the Sarangi to American and European audiences goes to Sabri Khan. He also played a duet with the renowned Yehudi Menuhin and was invited as a visiting professor by the University of Washington, Seattle, United States in 1981.

In appreciation of his contribution to the Classical Music of India, Ustad Sabri Khan received numerous honours and awards, including the Sahitya Kala Parishad Award, UP, Sangeet Natak Academy Award, National Sangeet Natak Academy Award, the prestigious Padma Shree Award (1992) and Padma Bhushan Award (2006) by the President of India – Government of India.

Family
Ustad Sabri Khan Sahib has four sons (1) Sarwar Sabri (2) Jamal Sabri (3) Kamal Sabri (4) Gulfam Sabri, and five daughters. He has many grandsons playing musical instruments: Suhail Yusuf Khan (Sarangi), Faisal Yusuf
Khan (Tabla), Shariq Khan (Tabla), Junaid (Guitar) and Nabeel Khan (Sarangi).

Death and legacy
In the early morning on 1 December 2015, Ustad Sabri Khan died surrounded by his family at his home in New Delhi at age 88.

Awards and honours

Sahitya Kala Parishad Award
Shobhna Kala Sangam Award – 1985
Begum Akhtar Award
 Sangeet Natak Akademi Award – 1986
Uttar Pradesh Sangeet Natak Academy Award, Lucknow, UP – 1990
Padma Shree Award by the President of India, Government of India – 1992
Ustad Chand Khan Award – 2002
Sangeet Bhushan Award – 2002
Lifetime Achievement Award – LEGENDS OF INDIA – DMA – Delhi – 2003
National Artist Award – All India Radio Prasar Bharti Award – 2004
Padma Bhushan Award by the President of India, Government of India – 2006
Sangeet Natak Akademi Tagore Ratna Award – 2012

References

External links

1927 births
2015 deaths
Hindustani instrumentalists
Indian male classical musicians
Indian Muslims
Recipients of the Padma Bhushan in arts
Recipients of the Padma Shri in arts
People from Moradabad
Sarangi players
20th-century Indian male classical singers
Recipients of the Sangeet Natak Akademi Award
Chishti-Sabiris